Glasshouse Christian College is an independent Christian school located on the Sunshine Coast in Beerwah Queensland, Australia. The college was established by the Glasshouse Country Baptist Church and first opened on 31 January 2000 with an enrolment of 16 students, and has since expanded to a college of more than 1070 students from Prep to Year 12.

Since January 2008, the school's role of Principal has been held by Mike Curtis.

Facilities
Glasshouse Christian College consists of the following school facilities:
 More than 60 classrooms
Modern Music & Performing Arts Centre
Sports Centre with Gymnasium and Undercover Courts
 School library
 Theatre
 Hospitality Kitchen
 Industrial Technology and Engineering Workshops
 Dance Studio
 Science Laboratories
 Two Sports Ovals
 Three large undercover areas
 Two Courtyards
 Three Playgrounds
 Access to a fully working Farm

Curriculum

Primary school (Prep–Year 6)
All students in the primary school phase participate in the specialist lessons of Art, Dance, Drama, French, Music and Health & Physical Education. Students from Prep to Year 2 participate in the school's Kitchen Garden Program, which enables them to learn about nutrition and how to grow fruit and vegetables. Students in Year 3 participate in the Smart Strings Violin Program and in Year 5, students are provided with a musical instrument of their choice and weekly tuition is provided for them to participate in the Year 5 Band Program. Students also have opportunities to participate in Concert Band, Chorus, Dance and inter-school sports.

Middle school (Years 7–9)
Students in the middle school phase undertake the core subjects of Mathematics, Humanities (combined English and History class), Foundations (Christian Studies), Science, French and Core Physical Education. Students in Year 7 study the Foundations, Understanding Society & English (FUSE) program, which incorporates the subjects previously referred to as English & Humanities (History & Geography), Pastoral Care and Foundations (Christian Studies). Students in Year 8 study the Science, Technology, Engineering & Mathematics (STEM) program, which incorporates the subjects previously referred to as Science, Business & ICT, Mathematics, Foundations and Pastoral Care.

Students in Years 7 and 8 undertake one term each of the following elective subjects:

 Business
 Dance
 Design Technology
 Drama
 Food Technology
 Industrial Technology
 Information Communication & Technology
 Music
 Textiles Technology
 Visual Art

Students in Year 9 continue studying the six core subjects as well as three of the elective subjects as studied in Years 7 and 8 of their choice.

Senior School (Years 10–12)
Glasshouse Christian College offers a range of General and Applied subjects to students from Years 10 to 12.

General subjects include:

 The Arts
 Dance
 Drama
 Music
 Visual Art
 Business and Information Technology
 Digital Solutions
 Legal Studies
 Design and Technologies
 Design
 Engineering
 English
 General English
 Literature
 French
 Health and Physical Education
 Physical Education
 Hospitality
 Food and Nutrition
 Humanities
 Ancient History
 Modern History
 Mathematics
 General Mathematics
 Mathematical Methods
 Specialist Mathematics (Years 11 & 12 only)
 Science
 Agricultural Science
 Biology
 Chemistry
 Physics

Applied subjects include:

 Essential English
 Essential Mathematics
 Fashion Studies
 Hospitality Practices
 Industrial Technology Skills
 Introduction to Hospitality (Year 10 only)
 Sport and Recreation

References

External links

 

Private schools in Queensland
Baptist schools in Australia
Schools on the Sunshine Coast, Queensland
Educational institutions established in 2000
2000 establishments in Australia